This is a list of notable people who were born or have lived in Ufa, Russia.

Born in Ufa

18th century

1701–1800 
 Sergey Aksakov (1791–1859), Russian literary figure remembered for his semi-autobiographical tales of family life, as well as his books on hunting and fishing

19th century

1801–1900 
 Nikolay Zhukovsky (1833–1895), Russian revolutionary and narodnik
 Georgiy Afanasyev (1848–1925), Russian and Ukrainian historian, politician and diplomat
 Vera Timanova (1855–1942), Russian pianist
 Mikhail Nesterov (1862–1942), major representative of religious symbolism in Russian art
 Yekaterina Kuskova (1869–1958), Russian economist, journalist and politician
 Ilya Bondarenko (1870–1947), Russian-Soviet architect, historian and preservationist
 Ivan Meshchaninov (1883–1967), Soviet linguist and ethnographer
 Alexander Serebrovsky (1884–1938), Russian revolutionary and Soviet petroleum and mining engineer nicknamed the "Soviet Rockefeller"
 Yuri Rall (1890-1948), Soviet naval officer, vice-admiral
 Mirsaid Sultan-Galiev (1892–1940), Tatar Bolshevik

20th century

1901–1920 
 Boris Gudz (1902–2006), the last survivor of the October Revolution, a veteran of the Russian Civil War and an OGPU security agent
 Jarosław Skulski (1907–1977), Russian-born Polish film and theatre actor
 Elizaveta Mukasei (1912–2009), Soviet spy codenamed Elza
 Viktor Khokhryakov (1913–1986), Soviet Russian film actor, theater actor and director
 Natalya Kovshova (1920–1942), female Soviet sniper who fought in the Great Patriotic War

1921–1940 
 Liya Shakirova (1921–2015), Soviet and Russian linguist
 Grigory Svirsky (born 1921), Russian-Canadian writer
 Lena Mukhina (1924–1991), Russian woman, who wrote her experiences as teenage schoolgirl during the Siege of Leningrad in her diary, pouring out her hopes and fears
 Georgi Mosolov (born 1926), Soviet test pilot and Hero of the Soviet Union
 Igor Plechanov (1933–2007), Soviet speedway rider
 Renart Suleymanov (born 1937), Russian sport shooter

1941–1950 
 Sergei Dovlatov (1941–1990), Russian and American journalist and writer
 Serhiy Komisarenko (born 1943), Ukrainian scientist, politician, and diplomat
 Vladimir Spivakov (born 1944), Russian conductor and violinist
 Andrei Boltnev (1946–1995), Soviet and Russian actor
 Anatoly Kvashnin (born 1946), Chief of the Russian General Staff from 1997 to 2004 and Hero of the Russian Federation

1951–1960 
 Viktor Anokhin (born 1951), Soviet Russian sprint athlete
 Viatcheslav Nazarov (1952–1996), Russian world-class jazz trombonist, pianist, and vocalist
 Zilya Valeeva (born 1952), politician in Republic of Tatarstan in Russia
 Oleg Vyugin (born 1952), Head of the Federal Financial Markets Service of Russia
 Valery Limasov (born 1955), Soviet Russian boxer
 Sergey Veremeenko (born 1955), Russian businessman
 Vladimir Vinogradov (1955–2008), owner and president of Inkombank
 Irek Gimayev (born 1957), Soviet ice hockey player
 Igor Sokolov (born 1958), Soviet sport shooter and Olympic champion

1961–1970 
 Ural Rakhimov (born 1961), Russian businessman of Bashkir ethnicity
 Ramil Yuldashev (born 1961), Ukrainian ice hockey winger
 Natalia Molchanova (1962–2015), Russian champion free diver, multiple world record holder and the former president of the Russian Free Dive Federation
 Svetlana Zainetdinova (born 1962), Estonian chess Woman FIDE Master
 Ildar Garifullin (born 1963), Soviet/Russian Nordic combined skier
 Elvira Nabiullina (born 1963), Tatar born-Russian economist and head of the Central Bank of Russia
 Eugene Shvidler (born 1964), Soviet-born businessman
 Anatoly Emelin (born 1964), Soviet/Russian ice hockey player
 Rustem Dautov (born 1965), German chess Grandmaster of Tatar origin
 Anvar Ibragimov (born 1965), Soviet fencer
 Igor Kravchuk (born 1966), Russian ice hockey defenceman
 Igor Nikitin (1966–2013), Russian ice hockey player and coach
 Vadym Rubel (born 1966), Ukrainian historian
 Alexander Semak (born 1966), Russian professional ice hockey centre
 Ratmir Timashev (born 1966), Russian IT entrepreneur
 Pavel Muslimov (born 1967), Russian biathlete
 Veniamin Tayanovich (born 1967), Russian freestyle swimmer
 Oleg Yeryomin (born 1967), Russian football player
 Andrei Cherkasov (born 1970), Soviet and Russian professional tennis player

1971–1975 
 Svetlana Gladysheva (born 1971), Russian alpine skier
 Ildar Pomykalov (born 1971), Russian Paralympian athlete
 Vadim Milov (born 1972), Swiss grandmaster of chess
 Denis Afinogenov (born 1974), Russian professional ice hockey player
 Andrey Gubin (born 1974), Russian pop-singer, poet, composer, and record producer
 Albert Lukmanov (born 1974), Russian professional football player
 Vadim Sharifijanov (born 1975), Russian professional ice hockey right winger
 Nikolai Tsulygin (born 1975), Russian professional ice hockey player

1976–1980 
 Ildar Abdrazakov (born 1976), Russian bass opera singer
 Alexei Seliverstov (born 1976), Russian bobsledder
 Zemfira (born 1976), Russian rock musician
 Konstantin Fomichev (born 1977), Russian sprint canoeist
 Arthur Khamidulin (born 1977), Russian ski jumper
 Evgeni Petrov (born 1978), Russian professional road bicycle racer
 Andrei Zyuzin (born 1978), Russian professional ice hockey player
 Denis Khlystov (born 1979), Russian professional ice hockey centre
 Andrei Sidyakin (born 1979), Russian ice hockey forward
 Dimitry Vassiliev (born 1979), Russian ski jumper
 Artem Derepasko (born 1980), Russian professional tennis player
 Ruslan Nurtdinov (born 1980), Russian professional ice hockey winger

1981–1985 
 Mikhail Sorokin (born 1981), ski-orienteering competitor who has competed for Russia and Kazakhstan
 Ildar Fatchullin (born 1982), Russian-Tatar ski jumper
 Evdokia Gretchichnikova (born 1982), Russian modern pentathlete
 Sergey Maslennikov (born 1982), Russian Nordic combined skier
 Evgueni Nourislamov (born 1982), Russian professional ice hockey defenceman
 Alexander Seluyanov (born 1982), Russian professional ice hockey defenceman
 Yelizaveta Grechishnikova (born 1983), Russian long-distance runner
 Dmitri Makarov (born 1983), Russian professional ice hockey winger
 Nikita Shchitov (born 1983), Russian professional ice hockey defenceman
 Igor Volkov (born 1983), Russian professional ice hockey player
 Ruslan Abdrakhmanov (born 1984), Russian professional ice hockey player
 Sophie Milman (born 1984), Russian-born jazz vocalist who lives in Canada
 Artem Bulyansky (born 1985), Russian professional ice hockey forward
 Renal Ganeyev (born 1985), Russian fencer, who has won bronze Olympic medal in the team foil competition at the 2004 Summer Olympics in Athens
 Konstantin Makarov (born 1985), Russian professional ice hockey player

1986–1990 
 Elena Chalova (born 1987), professional Russian tennis player
 Alexander Loginov (born 1987), Russian professional ice hockey defenceman
 Oleksander Zhyrnyi (born 1987), Ukrainian biathlete of Russian origins
 Andrei Zubarev (born 1987), Russian professional ice hockey player
 Dmitri Zyuzin (born 1987), Russian professional ice hockey player
 Nikita Davydov (born 1988), Russian professional ice hockey goaltender
 Artyom Gordeyev (born 1988), Russian professional ice hockey player
 Lyaysan Rayanova (born 1989), Russian alpine skier
 Vladimir Sokhatsky (born 1989), Russian professional ice hockey goaltender
 Semion Elistratov (born 1990), Russian short-track speed-skater, the 2014 Olympic champion in the 5000m relay
 Pavel Ilyashenko (born 1990), modern pentathlete from Kazakhstan
 Rafael Khakimov (born 1990), Russian ice hockey goaltender
 Yuri Kirillov (born 1990), Russian professional footballer
 Kseniya Makeyeva (born 1990), Russian female handball player

1991–2000 
 Anton Babikov (born 1991), Russian biathlete
 Ilmir Hazetdinov (born 1991), Russian ski jumper of Tatar descent
 Anton Koprivitsa (born 1991), Russian snowboarder
 Ranya Mordanova (born 1991), Russian fashion model
 Alexander Pankov (born 1991), Russian professional ice hockey player
 Ernest Yahin (born 1991), Russian Nordic combined skier
 Sergei Yemelin (born 1991), Russian professional ice hockey player
 Artyom Gareyev (born 1992), Russian professional ice hockey player
 Ildar Isangulov (born 1992), Russian ice hockey defenceman
 Dmitry Migunov (born 1992), Russian short-track speed-skater
 Galina Lukina (born 1992), Russian fashion model
 Evgeni Nikiforov (born 1993), Russian professional ice hockey forward
 Albert Sharipov (born 1993), Russian professional football player
 Alexei Vasilevsky (born 1993), Russian ice hockey defenceman
 Eduard Gimatov (born 1994), Russian ice hockey player
 Bulat Khayernasov (born 1994), Russian football forward
 Daniil Kvyat (born 1994), Russian auto racing driver
 Igor Bezdenezhnykh (born 1996), Russian professional football player
 Ivan Dryomin (born 1997), Russian rap artist
 Mikhail Vorobyev (born 1997), Russian ice hockey forward
 Morgenshtern (born 1998), Russian rapper

Lived in Ufa 

 Dmitry Shuvayev (1854–1937), Russian military leader, Infantry General
 Valerian Albanov (1881–1919), Russian navigator; born in Voronezh and was raised by his uncle in the city of Ufa
 Murtaza Rakhimov (born 1934), Russian politician of Bashkir ethnicity who served as the first President of Bashkortostan, a republic within Russia, from 1993 to 2010
 Rudolf Nureyev (1938–1993), Soviet dancer of ballet and modern dance
 Yuri Shevchuk (born 1957), Soviet and Russian singer/songwriter

Died in Ufa 
 Joseph Le Brix (1899–1931), French aviator and a capitain de corvette (lieutenant commander) in the French Navy

See also 

 List of Russian people
 List of Russian-language poets

References 

People from Ufa
Ufa
List